Colin Cuthbert Orr Colahan (12 February 1897, Woodend, Victoria – 6 June 1987, Ventimiglia) was an Australian painter and sculptor. Educated at Xavier College.

Second youngest of the six children of Surgeon-Major-General John Joseph Aloysius Colahan (1836-1918), and Eliza McDowell Colahan (1859–1899), née Orr: Mary Margarita Colahan (1886–1965); Beatrice Clare Colahan (1889–1984); Frederick John Orr Colahan (1892–1982); John Maurice Orr "Jack" Colahan (1894–1917); Colin; and Basil Nicholas Orr Colahan (1898–1980)., 

While a student in Melbourne, and joined Max Meldrum's school of painting and subsequently became a key figure of the Australian tonalist movement. In 1937 he joined and exhibited with Robert Menzies' Australian Academy of Art.

Colahan created the 'Sirena' fountain for the Italian town of Bordighera. His sculpture of the head of Victor Smorgon was bought by the National Gallery of Victoria. His work can be found in the collections of the state galleries of Melbourne, Adelaide and Brisbane. He was appointed an Australian official war artist in 1942.

A portrait in oil of F. Matthias Alexander (of "Alexander technique" fame), painted by Colahan to commemorate the subject's 80th birthday, was shown on the BBC's Antiques Roadshow programme in May 2013, when it was still in the possession of the son of the wife of Alexander's nephew.

References

External links
Dr John Dale by Colin Colahan (1934) at the National Gallery of Victoria

1897 births
1987 deaths
Australian war artists
World War II artists
20th-century Australian sculptors
20th-century Australian painters
20th-century Australian male artists
Australian male painters
People educated at Xavier College
Australian people of Irish descent
Artists from Victoria (Australia)